"I Didn't Mean to Turn You On" is the debut single written by Jimmy Jam and Terry Lewis and originally performed by Cherrelle in 1984. In 1986, "I Didn't Mean to Turn You On" was covered by Robert Palmer. Palmer's cover fared better on the pop chart while Cherrelle's version was a hit on the R&B chart.

Original Cherrelle version
The song was released as Cherrelle's debut single and was her first hit, peaking at number 8 on the soul chart and number 79 on the Hot 100.  On the US dance chart, "I Didn't Mean to Turn You On" went to number 6. A slightly altered version of the song is featured in the 2015 N.W.A biopic Straight Outta Compton.

Chart positions

Robert Palmer version

English rock singer Robert Palmer recorded a cover version one year later and it was released as the fifth single from his eighth studio album Riptide (1985). The single hit No. 2 on the Billboard Hot 100 in 1986, behind "Amanda" by Boston. The music video, which was a take on the making of a music video, featured women like the ones featured in "Addicted to Love"; it hit No. 1 on MTV on October 17, 1986.

Chart positions

Weekly charts

Year end charts

Other cover versions
Queen Latifah sampled Cherrelle's version on her song "Turn You On" from her 1998 album Order in the Court.
Mariah Carey covered the song in 2001 for the soundtrack to the film, Glitter. Jimmy Jam and Terry Lewis also produced Carey's cover and she sang over the original instrumental.
 DJ Colette covered the song in 2005 for the album Hypnotized.

References

1984 debut singles
1986 singles
Songs written by Jimmy Jam and Terry Lewis
Song recordings produced by Jimmy Jam and Terry Lewis
Cherrelle songs
Robert Palmer (singer) songs
1984 songs
Tabu Records singles
Island Records singles
Song recordings produced by Bernard Edwards
Mariah Carey songs